Deering is a town in Hillsborough County, New Hampshire, United States. The population was 1,904 at the 2020 census.

History
First settled about 1765, the town was incorporated on January 17, 1774, by John Wentworth, governor of the Province of New Hampshire. He named it "Deering" after the maiden name of his wife, Frances Deering Wentworth, just as two years earlier he had bestowed Francestown with her first name. Deering had 928 residents when the first census was taken in 1790. By 1859, the population was 890. Its hills and valleys were well suited for agriculture. Industries included two sawmills, one gristmill, and one clothing factory.

Geography
Deering is in northwestern Hillsborough County, bordered by Hillsborough and Henniker to the north, Weare to the east, Francestown to the south, Bennington to the southwest, and Antrim to the west. Deering lies fully within the Merrimack River watershed. The eastern two-thirds of the town are drained by tributaries of the Piscataquog River, which flows east to join the Merrimack in Manchester, while the western third of the town drains to the Contoocook River, which forms the western boundary of the town and flows north to the Merrimack in Penacook.

The town is crossed by State Route 149, connecting Hillsborough to the north with Weare to the east.

Adjacent municipalities 
 Henniker, New Hampshire (north)
 Weare, New Hampshire (east)
 Francestown, New Hampshire (south)
 Bennington, New Hampshire (southwest)
 Antrim, New Hampshire (west)
 Hillsborough, New Hampshire (northwest)

Demographics

As of the census of 2010, there were 1,912 people, 740 households, and 534 families residing in the town. The population density was 62.1 people per square mile (24.0/km2). There were 932 housing units at an average density of 30.3 per square mile (11.7/km2). The racial makeup of the town was 97.0% White, 0.3% African American, 0.2% Native American or Alaska Native, 0.1% some other race, and 1.5% from two or more races. Hispanic or Latino of any race were 1.3% of the population.

There were 740 households, out of which 28.4% had children under the age of 18 living with them, 58.9% were headed by married couples living together, 7.3% had a female householder with no husband present, and 27.8% were non-families. 20.1% of all households were made up of individuals, and 6.2% were someone living alone who was 65 years of age or older. The average household size was 2.49, and the average family size was 2.85.

In the town, the population was spread out, with 19.4% under the age of 18, 7.2% from 18 to 24, 26.7% from 25 to 44, 33.2% from 45 to 64, and 13.5% who were 65 years of age or older. The median age was 42.9 years. For every 100 females, there were 107.4 males. For every 100 females age 18 and over, there were 105.1 males.

For the period 2009–2013, the estimated median annual income for a household in the town was $68,281, and the median income for a family was $76,389. Male full-time workers had a median income of $60,114 versus $40,272 for females. The per capita income for the town was $33,042. About 5.4% of families and 9.6% of the population were below the poverty line.

Notable people 

 James W. Grimes (1816–1872), US senator, third governor of Iowa
 Lotte Jacobi (1896–1990), photographer; lived in Deering from 1955 until her death in 1990
 Jenna Rheault (born 1996), professional ice hockey defender with Boston Pride
 Jon Rheault (born 1986), professional ice hockey forward with Adler Mannheim
 Tom Rush (born 1941), folk singer; lived in Deering (1971–1990)

References

External links
 
 New Hampshire Economic and Labor Market Information Bureau Profile

Towns in Hillsborough County, New Hampshire
Towns in New Hampshire